Coincidence is a 1921 American silent comedy film starring Robert Harron and June Walker. It was Harron's first starring role after signing a deal with Metro Pictures Corporation, as well as his last film; Harron died of a self-inflicted gunshot wound in September 1920 between completion of filming and the release. It was directed by Chester "Chet" Withey and written by Brian Hooker based on a story by Howard E. Morton. The cinematographer was Louis C. Bitzer.

According to film historian Anthony Slide, "With Robert Harron's death, the film industry for the first time had to deal with the release of a film whose star had just died under mysterious circumstances." The film was released in 1921, the year following Harron's death. Instead of promoting Coincidence as Harron's final film, Metro chose not to associate it with Harron's death and had a "low key" release.

Plot

Billy Jenks (Harron) leaves his small town to find success in New York City, but he settles for a department store cashier job. He gets in a heated romance with secretary and aspiring pianist Phoebe Howard (Walker). Their romance leads to both of them being fired, and Billy is later arrested for burglary. Billy tries to borrow money from his wealthy aunt, who has died without his knowledge. Also without his knowledge, she left him $100,000, and her estate lawyers manage to find Billy through a coincidence. The money is then stolen by a con man who also tries to woo Phoebe, but Billy gets both back through a series of coincidences. He and Phoebe then get married.

Cast
Bradley Barker as "Handsome Harry" Brent
Frank Belcher as John Carter
William Frederic as Stephen Fiske
Robert Harron as Billy Jenks
June Ellen Terry as Dorothy Carter
June Walker as Phoebe Howard

Production notes
Coincidence began shooting in Mamaroneck, New York in July 1920.  The film is now lost.  No prints are known to survive.

References

External links

1921 films
1921 comedy films
Silent American comedy films
American silent feature films
American black-and-white films
Films shot in New York (state)
Metro Pictures films
Films directed by Chester Withey
1920s American films